This Funny World was a gag cartoon panel syndicated to newspapers by the McNaught Syndicate from March 6, 1944, to 1985.

In addition to original cartoons, the series featured numerous reprints of cartoons previously published in leading magazines, including The American Magazine, American Legion Magazine, Collier's, Look, True and Woman's Home Companion.

Cartoonists
The single-panel series featured the cartoons of Stan and Jan Berenstain, Henry Boltinoff, Dick Cavalli, Stan Fine, Tom Hudson, Reamer Keller, Ted Key, Don Orehek, B. Tobey, Mort Walker, Pete Wyma and many others.

On Wednesday, August 16, 1944, a federal trademark registration was filed for This Funny World by the McNaught Syndicate
with the listed correspondent Panitch, Schwarze, Jacobs & Nadel at 2000 Market Street in Philadelphia.

See also
 1000 Jokes
 Laff-a-Day

References

External links
 The Fabulous Fifties

American comic strips
1944 comics debuts
Gag cartoon comics
1985 comics endings